Robert Reuben Jones (born 1902 in Gateshead) was a former footballer who played as an outside forward. After playing for High Fell F.C. he joined Liverpool for the 1920 - 21 season, then Huddersfield Town for the 1921-22 season. He played two league games for the Terriers, scoring one goal.

References

1902 births
Year of death missing
Footballers from Gateshead
Association football outside forwards
English Football League players
Huddersfield Town A.F.C. players
English footballers